This is the results breakdown of the local elections held in Castile and León on 22 May 2011. The following tables show detailed results in the autonomous community's most populous municipalities, sorted alphabetically.

City control
The following table lists party control in the most populous municipalities, including provincial capitals (shown in bold). Gains for a party are displayed with the cell's background shaded in that party's colour.

Municipalities

Ávila
Population: 58,245

Burgos
Population: 178,574

León
Population: 134,012

Palencia
Population: 82,169

Ponferrada
Population: 68,767

Salamanca
Population: 154,462

Segovia
Population: 55,748

Soria
Population: 39,838

Valladolid
Population: 315,522

Zamora
Population: 65,998

See also
2011 Castilian-Leonese regional election

References

Castile and León
2011